The Dolu is a local river in part of Sangu River Bangladesh.
 Dolu River  or  Tangkabati River  is a river in the eastern hills of Bandarban and Chittagong Districts. The length of the river is 53 kilometers, the average width is 16 meters, and the nature of the river is spiral. The Bangladesh Water Development Board gave the name Dalu.

References 

Rivers of Bangladesh
Chittagong District
Rivers of Chittagong Division